The 350th Reconnaissance Aviation Squadron (Serbo-Croatian:  / 350. извиђачка авијацијска ескадрила) was an aviation squadron of Yugoslav Air Force established in April 1961 at Tuzla military air base.

History
Squadron was formed as part of 103rd Reconnaissance Aviation Regiment equipped with US-made Lockheed RT/IT-33A Shooting Star jet-trainer aircraft equipped for aerial reconnaissance. In 1974 Shooting Stars were replaced with new domestic-made Soko Jastreb light-attack jet aircraft in IJ-21 reconnaissance version. In 1988 several Orao INJ-22 reconnaissance aircraft were introduced.
 
It was disbanded in 1990 with 701st Air Base.

Assignments
103rd Reconnaissance Aviation Regiment (1961-1966)
98th Aviation Brigade (1966-1978)
1st Aviation Corps (1978-1982)
98th Aviation Brigade (1982-1985)
1st Corps of Air Force and Air Defense (1986-1988)
701st Aviation Brigade (1988-1990)

Bases stationed
Tuzla Air Base (1961-1990)

Equipment
Lockheed RT/IT-33A Shooting Star (1961–1974)
Soko IJ-21 Jastreb (1974–1990)
Soko INJ-22 Orao (1988–1990)

References

Yugoslav Air Force squadrons
Military units and formations established in 1961
Military units and formations disestablished in 1990